Beatriz Beltrán Sanz (born 10 December 1997) is a Spanish footballer who plays as a defender for Valencia.

Club career
Bea Beltrán started her career at Atlético Madrid C.

References

External links
Profile at La Liga

1997 births
Living people
Women's association football defenders
Spanish women's footballers
Footballers from the Community of Madrid
Atlético Madrid Femenino players
Real Sociedad (women) players
Valencia CF Femenino players
Primera División (women) players
Spain women's youth international footballers
21st-century Spanish women